Black Math may refer to:

 "Black Math", an season 4 episode of the television show Black-ish
 "Black Math", a track on the 2003 White Stripes album Elephant

See also
 Black Math Experiment